Reṇukāchārya(also known as Revaṇārādhya or Revaṇasiddha) was one of the five acharyas who came in the Kali Yuga to teach and preach Vīraśaivism. He is said to have been born from the Someśvara linga, but to have travelled all over India to teach Vīraśaivism. The Someśvara temples are located in Kollipāki or Kolanupaka in Aler City, Yadadri district, Telangana, India.  

Texts date this mythical saint to the time of the Rāmāyaṇa since he was the teacher of the great sage Agastya of Pañcāvati.  This saint is said to have consecrated 30 million liṇgas at the behest of Ravana's brother, Vibhīṣaṇa, after Rāvaṇa's death.

He finally established the Rambhāpuri maṭha at Balehonnur,  a village in Narasimharajapura taluk, Chikkamagaluru district in the Indian state of Karnataka. The Reṇuka gotra of the Vīraśaivas is named after him.

References

Rishis
Indian Hindu missionaries